= Results of the 1887 Canadian federal election =

1887 Canadian federal election

== Results by Province ==
=== British Columbia ===
Results in British Columbia
Party	Seats	Second	Third	Fourth	Fifth	Votes	%	+/-
Conservative	4	2				2,416	52.54	
Liberal–Conservative	2					858	18.66	
Independent Conservative		1	1			721	15.68	
Liberals		1		1	1	603	13.11	
Total	6					4,598	100.0	

=== Manitoba ===
Results in Manitoba
Party	Seats	Second	Votes	%	+/-
Liberals	1	2	6,502	43.37	
Conservative	2	1	4,925	32.85	
Liberal–Conservative	2		2,787	18.59	
Independent Liberal		1	778	5.19	
Total	5		14,992	100.0	

=== New Brunswick ===
Results in New Brunswick
Party	Seats	Second	Third	Votes	%	+/-
Liberals	5	8		24,740	40.91	
Conservative	8	5		23,857	39.45	
Unknown			2	3,905	6.46	
Liberal–Conservative	2			3,648	6.03	
Independent Liberal	1			2,271	3.76	
Independent		2		2,055	3.4	
Total	16			60,476	100.0	

=== Northwest Territories ===
Results in Northwest Territories
Party	Seats	Second	Third	Votes	%	+/-
Conservative	4			4,217	58.41	
Liberals		3	1	2,220	30.75	
Independent Conservative		1		783	10.84	
Total	4			7,220	100.0	

=== Nova Scotia ===
Results in Nova Scotia
Party	Seats	Second	Third	Fourth	Fifth	Sixth	Votes	%	+/-
Liberals	7	11	2				34,773	41.77	
Conservative	10	6					34,265	41.16	
Liberal–Conservative	4	1					8,889	10.68	
Independent			2	1	1	1	4,800	5.77	
Independent Conservative			1				317	0.38	
Unknown			1				206	0.25	
Total	21						83,250	100.0	

=== Ontario ===
Results in Ontario
Party	Seats	Second	Third	Votes	%	+/-
Liberals	37	47	3	167,231	46.71	
Conservative	45	34		154,960	43.28	
Liberal–Conservative	9	1		20,422	5.7	
Unknown		6		11,123	3.11	
Independent Liberal	1	1		2,972	0.83	
Independent Conservative		1		1,134	0.32	
Independent			1	164	0.05	
Total	92			358,006	100.0	

=== Prince Edward Island ===
Results in Prince Edward Island
Party	Seats	Second	Third	Votes	%	+/-
Liberals	5			15,419	41.81	
Conservative		2	3	14,382	39	
Independent Liberal	1			4,314	11.7	
Liberal–Conservative		1		2,763	7.49	
Total	6			36,878	100.0	

=== Quebec ===
Results in Quebec
Party	Seats	Second	Third	Fourth	Votes	%	+/-
Liberals	24	25			61,075	38.26	
Conservative	23	22	1		52,123	32.65	
Liberal–Conservative	8	1			13,479	8.44	
Unknown		6	2	1	8,938	5.6	
Independent Conservative	3				8,390	5.26	
Independent Liberal	3	1			5,360	3.36	
Nationalist	1	3	2		4,784	3	
Nationalist Conservative	2				3,522	2.21	
Independent	1	1			1,965	1.23	
Total	65				159,636	100.0	
